Kasaragod Dwarf cattle (/) is a breed of cattle in Kerala. They originated in the mountain range of Kasaragod district. The cows are known for their excellent milking ability and give mineral rich milk with high feed to milk ratio. The cattle require almost zero inputs and can be free ranged. They are one among the four prime dwarf cattle in India along with Malnad Gidda, Punganur and Vechur Cattle.

Height averages at 107.3 cms. for males and 95.83 cms. for females.

References 

Cattle breeds originating in India
Agriculture in Kerala
Economy of Kasaragod district
Cattle breeds
Culture of Kasaragod district